Bronston is an unincorporated community in Pulaski County, Kentucky, United States. Bronston has a post office with ZIP code 42518.

References

Unincorporated communities in Pulaski County, Kentucky
Unincorporated communities in Kentucky